Saral is a small village in Maharashtra, India. It is situated in the Alibag taluka of Raigad district.

Transport 
The village is located on Alibag-Rewas road. An alternate route to reach here is Alibag-Rewas Via Hashiware. Both the routes meet at Saral Pul (Bridge). The village is at walking distance from the bridge. The village is also accessible from Mumbai by Boat via Mandwa or Rewas Port.

Demographics 

According to the 2011 census of India, Saral had a population of 1,551.

Saral has mixed population of different cast's residents dominantly Mali, Agree, Koli.

Landmarks 
The village has a well known temple of "Bapuji Dev". There is also a historic temple of Shiva. The architecture of the Shiva temple is based on Hindu architecture.

References 

Villages in Raigad district